The Best Actor Award is an award presented at the Annecy Italian Film Festival. It is chosen by the jury from the 'official section' of movies at the festival. 
It was first awarded in 2002.

Award Winners

External links
 Annecy Italian Film Festival official website
 Annecy Italian Film Festival at IMDb

Film awards for lead actor